Extra Life is an American experimental band from Brooklyn, New York, United States. They are known for using unusual rhythms and time signatures, and for frontman Charlie Looker's unique singing style, which often uses melisma and is reminiscent of medieval and Renaissance music. The band straddle genres, regularly collaborating live with avant-garde jazz saxophonist Travis Laplante, having songs remixed by Xiu Xiu, and playing alongside black metal band Liturgy during the release show for their 2012 album Dream Seeds.

The band was named for its original line-up: Looker, along with back-up musicians. Looker was previously a member of Zs and Dirty Projectors, while Podgurski also played drums in Yukon, and Caley Monahon-Ward violin in Snowblink. 

Their second album, Made Flesh, was named one of the best albums of 2010 by The Quietus. On November 13, 2012, Extra Life officially disbanded. According to a statement, this was because "the inner creative momentum driving the band...stalled." They reunited in 2022 to self-release the album Secular Works Vol. 2, featuring a lineup consisting of Looker on voice and guitars, Monahon-Ward on violin and viola, Toby Driver of Kayo Dot on electric bass and Gil Chevigné on drums and percussion.

Discography
Extra Life (EP) (2008)
Secular Works (2008)
A Split (split EP with Nat Baldwin) (2008)
Made Flesh (2010)
Larkin Grimm / Extra Life 12" (split single with Larkin Grimm) (2011)
Ripped Heart (EP) (2011)
Dream Seeds (2012)
Secular Works Vol. 2 (2022)

References

External links
[ Allmusic biography: Extra Life]
Interview with Charlie Looker in Impose Magazine
"Band to watch: Extra Life" on Stereogum

Northern Spy Records artists
American experimental musical groups
Musical groups from Brooklyn